The Music Improvisation Company is an album by saxophonist Evan Parker, guitarist Derek Bailey, Hugh Davies on various self-made electronic devices, and percussionist Jamie Muir (along with vocalist Christine Jeffrey added on two tracks) which was recorded in 1970 and released on the ECM label.

Reception

Allmusic's Chris Kelsey noted "Although the musicians were conversant in jazz styles, the music made by the MIC was essentially and intentionally non-idiomatic, drawing upon any and all elements of musical thought and given voice in the moment. The resulting music was dissonant, discontinuous, and ultimately in the vanguard of improvised music".
Tyran Grillo wrote that "As can be expected from one look at the roster, the musicianship is excellent. Evan Parker steals the show with his bubbling outbursts of indiscernible melody while Bailey cultivates an even more anonymous approach, cutting in and out with a surgeon’s touch. In the end, such a project can only be what one makes of it. Its difficulties are also what make it go down smoothly, even as its effortless approach renders it impossible to fathom. It is a mysterious object, to be sure, and one that casts a new reflection with every turn".

Track listing
All compositions by Derek Bailey, Hugh Davies, Jamie Muir and Evan Parker except where noted.
 "Third Stream Boogaloo" (Bailey, Davies, Christine Jeffrey, Muir, Parker) – 2:40
 "Dragon Path" – 10:25
 "Packaged Eel" – 8:43
 "Untitled No. I" – 7:06
 "Untitled No. II" (Bailey, Davies, Jeffrey, Muir, Parker) – 7:33
 "Tuck" – 3:05
 "Wolfgang Van Gangbang" – 6:54

Personnel
Derek Bailey – guitar
Hugh Davies – electronics
Jamie Muir – percussion
Evan Parker – soprano saxophone 
Christine Jeffrey – vocals (tracks 1 & 5)

References

Free improvisation albums
ECM Records albums
Derek Bailey (guitarist) albums
1970 albums
Evan Parker albums
Collaborative albums
Albums produced by Manfred Eicher